The 2006–07 season saw Glasgow Warriors compete in the Celtic League and the European Challenge Cup.

Season overview

After impressive preseason displays, Glasgow Warriors played its first game in the new Celtic League against Newport Gwent Dragons, losing 23–24 after a last minute penalty.

Glasgow then did not lose another home game until Ulster came to Hughenden in January 2007. Glasgow drew away to English side Saracens in the European Challenge Cup, en route to a quarter-final berth, but was drawn against Saracens and lost 23–19 at Vicarage Road.

The Warriors defeated both Scottish rivals, Edinburgh and Border Reivers, just a week apart, and at the start of April title hopefuls Leinster arrived at Hughenden. Glasgow won the game 26–20, before following it up with a good away win against Irish side Connacht. The next game saw Glasgow travel to Ravenhill to face Ulster, one of only 2 sides to beat them at Hughenden, and the team stunned the home crowd by winning the game.

Then it was the turn of Welsh side, the Neath–Swansea Ospreys (a side that would win the title at Netherdale the following week) to travel to Hughenden. The Ospreys crossed the Glasgow try line within 45 seconds, and crossed twice more to take a (26–9) lead just minutes from half-time, before Glasgow's Dan Parks converted his own try to take it to 26–16 at half time. In the second half, Parks kicked another penalty before setting up Graeme Morrison for a try, which he converted to level the scores. Parks kicked a penalty from just shy of the half-way line to take a three-point lead and the Ospreys couldn't find a way out of their own half for the remaining 20 minutes.

The Warriors failed to make it five in a row the following week, but coach Sean Lineen was happy with his team's performance over the season nonetheless.

Team

Coaches

 Gary Mercer, defence coach

Squad

Academy players

  Willie Brown – Prop
  Moray Low – Prop
  Pat MacArthur – Hooker
  Allan Kelly – Lock
  Calum Forrester – Flanker
  Colin White – Flanker

  Jamie Hunter – Scrum-half
  Ruaridh Jackson – Fly-half
  Ben Addison – Wing

Back up players

Other players used by Glasgow Warriors over the course of the season.

  Nico Nyemba (Hillhead Jordanhill) - Hooker
  Ross McCallum (Glasgow Hawks) - Tighthead Prop
  Andy Dunlop (Biggar) - Flanker
  Andrew Rennick (unattached) - Flanker

  Ryan Moffat (Cartha Queens Park) - Fly-half
  Alan Gibbon (Cartha Queens Park) - Centre
  Tony Nyangweso (Cartha Queens Park) - Centre
  Stevie Gordon (Glasgow Hawks) - Wing
  Rory Watson (Glasgow Hutchesons Aloysians) - Wing

Player statistics

During the 2006–07 season, Glasgow used 34 different players in competitive games. The table below shows the number of appearances and points scored by each player.

Staff movements

Coaches

Personnel in

Personnel out

  Mark Bitcon to  Scotland

Staff

Personnel in

 Charles Shaw – Chairman from  Greenock
 Archie Ferguson – Board Member
 Bill Nolan – Board Member
 John Lynch (Glasgow City Councillor) – Board Member

Player movements

Academy promotions

  Stuart Corsar

Player transfers

In

  Francisco Leonelli from  Edinburgh
  Alastair Kellock from  Edinburgh
  Calum Cusiter from  Border Reivers (loan)

Out

  Calum Cusiter to  Border Reivers (loan ends)
  Gregor Hayter to  Newbury

Competitions

Pre-season and friendlies

Match 1

Glasgow Warriors: Justin Va'a, Eric Milligan, Euan Murray, Andy Newman, Dan Turner, Steve Swindall, John Barclay, Jon Petrie, Graeme Beveridge, Dan Parks, Thom Evans, Scott Barrow, Graeme Morrison, Hefin O'Hare, Colin Shaw
Replacements: Stuart Corsar, James Eddie, John Beattie, Andy Wilson, Mike Roberts, Andrew Henderson, Willie Brown, Moray Low, Allan Kelly, Calum Forrester, Jamie Hunter, Ruaridh Jackson, Ben Addison, Pat MacArthur, Mike Adamson 

Moseley: 
Replacements:

Match 2

Glasgow Warriors: Stuart Corsar, Eric Milligan, Moray Low, Allan Kelly, Dan Turner, Calum Forrester, Andy Wilson, John Barclay,Graeme Beveridge, Ruaridh Jackson, Colin Shaw, Scott Barrow, Hefin O'Hare, Ben Addison, Sean Marsden
Replacements: Alan Gibbon (Cartha Queen's Park), Ryan Moffat (Cartha Queen's Park), Mike Adamson, Jamie Hunter, James Eddie,Pat MacArthur, Willie Brown, Andy Dunlop (Biggar), Andy Rennick (unattached). (all used)

Newcastle Falcons: 15 Anthony Elliott, 14 Cameron Johnston, 13 Tom Dillon, 12 Mark Mayerhofler, 11 Jack Harrison, 10 Toby Flood, 9 Hall Charlton (captain), 1 Jon Golding, 2 Matt Thompson, 3 Robbie Morris, 4 Sean Tomes, 5 Stuart Walker, 6 Brent Wilson, 7 Cory Harris, 8 Greg Irvin
Replacements: Oliver Tomazszcek, Ross Batty, Phil Dawson, Tim Visser, Ed Williamson, Tom Jokelson, Adam Dehaty, Mark Laycock, Michael Young

Match 3

Glasgow Warriors: Justin Va'a, Fergus Thomson, Euan Murray, Andy Newman, Alastair Kellock, Steve Swindall, Donnie Macfadyen,John Beattie, Sam Pinder, Dan Parks, Mike Roberts, Andrew Henderson, Graeme Morrison, Thom Evans, Francisco Leonelli
Replacements: Colin Shaw, Hefin O'Hare. Kevin Tkachuk, Jon Petrie, Stuart Corsar, Dan Turner, Andy Wilson, John Barclay (all used)

Newcastle Falcons: 15 Matthew Burke (captain), 14 John Rudd, 13 Jamie Noon, 12 Joe Shaw, 11 Ollie Phillips, 10 Jonny Wilkinson, 9 James Grindal, 1 Micky Ward, 2 Andy Long, 3 David Wilson, 4 Andy Perry, 5 Andy Buist, 6 Mike McCarthy, 7 Ben Woods, 8 Phil Dowson
Replacements:

Match 4

Glasgow Warriors: Justin Va'a, Fergus Thomson, Euan Murray, Andy Newman, Alastair Kellock, Steve Swindall, Donnie Macfadyen, Jon Petrie, Sam Pinder, Dan Parks, Mike Roberts, Andrew Henderson, Graeme Morrison, Thom Evans, Francisco Leonelli
Replacements: Colin Shaw, Hefin O'Hare, Jamie Hunter, Ruaridh Jackson, Scott Barrow, Kevin Tkachuk, James Eddie, Dan Turner, Andy Wilson, John Barclay, Eric Milligan

Newcastle Falcons: M Burke (capt); J Shaw, J Noon, T Flood, A Elliott; J Wilkinson, H Charlton; M Ward, A Long, D Wilson, A Perry, A Buist, M McCarthy, P Dowson, C Harris
Replacements (all used): J Golding, R Morris, M Thompson, J Oakes, B Wilson, B Woods, J Grindal, T Dillon, T Visser, J Rudd

Match 5

Glasgow Warriors: Stuart Corsar, Scott Lawson, Ben Prescott, James Eddie, Dan Turner, Steve Swindall, Andy Dunlop, Calum Forrester, Jamie Hunter, Colin Gregor, Mike Adamson, Scott Barrow, Graeme Morrison, Ben Addison, Sean Marsden

Replacements: Tony Nyangweso (Cartha QP), Ryan Moffat (Cartha QP), Ruaridh Jackson, Sam Pinder, Colin White, Willie Brown, Allan Kelly, Moray Low, Eric Milligan (all used)

Edinburgh Rugby: D McCall, P Jorgensen, M Dey, R Kerr (Glasgow Hawks); A Monro, G Laidlaw; K Traynor, AKelly, A Dymock, D Duley, S Turnbull, A MacDonald, DCallam, S Cross.
Replacements: A Warnock (Currie), P Louden (Edinburgh Academical), A Easson, C Ferguson, R Samson (Tynedale), S Lawrie, I Brown, F McKenzie, F Pringle, RWeston (Currie).

Match 6

Border Reivers: 

Replacements: 

Glasgow Warriors: Rory Lamont, Ben Addison, Mike Adamson (Glasgow Hawks), Scott Barrow [capt], Mike Roberts, Ruaridh Jackson,Jamie Hunter, Kevin Tkachuk, Eric Milligan, Ben Prescott, Allan Kelly, Dan Turner, Colin White, Calum Forrester, Steve Swindall
Replacements: Stuart Corsar, Moray Low, Pat MacArthur (Ayr), Willie Brown, Andy Dunlop (Biggar), Stuart McGee (Boroughmuir), Ryan Moffat (Cartha QP) Tony Nyangweso (Cartha QP) (all used)

Match 7

Scotland U20: 
Replacements from 

Glasgow Warriors: 15. Colin Shaw 14. Ben Addison 13. Sean Marsden 12. Scott Barrow 11. Mike Adamson 10. Ruaridh Jackson9. Calum Cusiter, 1. Stuart Corsar 2. Nico Nyemba 3. Moray Low 4. Allan Kelly 5. Richie Gray 6. Colin White 7. Steve Swindall 8. Calum ForresterReplacements: Willie Brown, Andy Dunlop, Max Evans, Colin Gregor, Stuart McGee, Ryan Moffat, Neil Robertson, Joe Stafford, Dan Turner

Match 8

Border Reivers: James Thomson (Heriot's); Nick De Luca, John Houston (Heriot's), Bryan Rennie, Dougie Flockhart; Gregor Townsend,Calum Cusiter; Bruce McNeil, Steve Scott, Geoff Cross, Dave Duley (Edinburgh Rugby), Stuart Grimes, Fergus Pringle (Edinburgh Rugby),Andy Millar, Richie Vernon

Replacements: Graham Hogg, Rob Chrystie, Ryan Grant, Nick Hart (Watsonians), Ed Kalman, Torrie Callander (Watsonians),John Coutts (Hawick), Callum Anderson (Melrose)

Glasgow Warriors: Sean Marsden; Max Evans, Hefin O'Hare, Scott Barrow, Colin Shaw; Colin Gregor, Sam Pinder; Stuart Corsar, Eric Milligan, Ben Prescott, Andy Newman, Dan Turner, Steve Swindall, John Barclay, Colin White
Replacements: Willie Brown, Andy Dunlop (Biggar), James Eddie, Allan Kelly, Ross McCallum (Glasgow Hawks), Fergus ThomsonAndrew Wilson, Graeme Beveridge, Stevie Gordon (Glasgow Hawks), Jamie Hunter, Ryan Moffat (Cartha QP), Tony Nyangweso (Cartha QP), Rory Watson (GHA)

Match 9

Glasgow Warriors: Justin Va'a, Fergus Thomson, Moray Low, Andy Newman, Dan Turner, Steve Swindall, Andy Wilson, Colin White,Jamie Hunter, Colin Gregor, Thom Evans, Scott Barrow, Graeme Morrison, Hefin O'Hare, Colin Shaw
	
Replacements: Eric Milligan, Ben Prescott, Kevin Tkachuk, Ben Prescott, Scott Lawson, James Eddie, Calum Forrester, Ben Addison, Max Evans, Sean Marsden	
	
	
Glasgow Hawks: 	
Replacements:

Celtic League

Table

Results

Each team played 20 matches in the league. That meant each team would have two bye weeks during the 22-round league season.

Round 1

Round 2

Round 3

Round 4

Round 5

Round 6

Round 7

Round 8

Round 9

Round 10

Glasgow Warriors sat out this round.

Round 11

Round 12

Round 13

Round 14

Round 15

Round 16

Round 17

Glasgow Warriors sat out this round.

Round 18

Round 19

Round 20

Round 21

Round 22

European Challenge Cup

Table

Pool 2

Results

Round 1

Round 2

Round 3

Round 4

Round 5

Round 6

Quarter finals

Competitive debuts this season

A player's nationality shown is taken from the nationality at the highest honour for the national side obtained; or if never capped internationally their place of birth. Senior caps take precedence over junior caps or place of birth; junior caps take precedence over place of birth. A player's nationality at debut may be different from the nationality shown. Combination sides like the British and Irish Lions or Pacific Islanders are not national sides, or nationalities.

Players in BOLD font have been capped by their senior international XV side as nationality shown.

Players in Italic font have capped either by their international 7s side; or by the international XV 'A' side as nationality shown.

Players in normal font have not been capped at senior level.

A position in parentheses indicates that the player debuted as a substitute. A player may have made a prior debut for Glasgow Warriors in a non-competitive match, 'A' match or 7s match; these matches are not listed.

Tournaments where competitive debut made:

Crosshatching indicates a jointly hosted match.

Sponsorship

Official Kit Supplier

KooGa

References

2006–07
2006–07 in Scottish rugby union
2006–07 Celtic League by team
2006–07 European Challenge Cup